Tillandsia turneri is a species of flowering plant in the family Bromeliaceae. This species is native to Venezuela, Colombia, Guyana, and northern Brazil.

Three varieties are recognized:

Tillandsia turneri var. orientalis L.B.Sm. - southern Venezuela, Guyana, northern Brazil
Tillandsia turneri var. patens L.B.Sm. - northwestern Venezuela
Tillandsia turneri var. turneri - Colombia, northwestern Venezuela

References

turneri
Flora of South America
Epiphytes
Plants described in 1888
Taxa named by John Gilbert Baker